Magic Mike XXL is a 2015 American comedy-drama film directed by Gregory Jacobs, written by Reid Carolin and starring Channing Tatum, Matt Bomer, Kevin Nash and Joe Manganiello. A sequel to 2012's Magic Mike, the film premiered in Hollywood on June 26, 2015. The film was theatrically released in the United States on July 1, 2015, received lukewarm reviews from critics, and grossed $122 million worldwide. A third film, Magic Mike's Last Dance, was released in February 2023.

Plot
Three years after quitting male stripping, Mike has his own furniture business. He receives a call from Tarzan who informs him that Dallas is "gone." Believing that his former boss has died, Mike goes to a hotel to find his friends, the remaining Kings of Tampa, at a pool party.

After revealing Dallas bailed on them to start a new show in Macau and only took "The Kid" (referencing Adam from Magic Mike) with him, the Kings let Mike in on their plan: to end their careers on a high note at the Myrtle Beach male stripping convention. Later, while trying to work, Mike dances to a song he used to strip to. Reinvigorated, he decides to join them on their trip.

Driving in a fro-yo van owned by Tito and Tobias, they make their first stop at Mad Mary's. To prove to Richie he's willing to commit to the trip, Mike participates in an amateur drag queen contest, and the others join him shortly. They then go to a beach where Mike lets Ken hit him to resolve his issues with him. He also meets photographer Zoe who tells him that she's off to New York. They flirt but agree to not have sex.

Back on the road, Mike suggests that they change their routine after the group (except Tarzan) take MDMA. At a gas station he coerces Richie into trying to make the cashier smile with an improvised striptease. This inspires the others to abandon their old routines. 

Soon after, Tobias falls asleep at the wheel crashes the van. Tobias suffers a concussion and needs hospitalization; everyone else is left unscathed. In the hospital, they begin to lose morale, and contemplate quitting and heading home. Mike then reveals that his furniture business isn't going that well and that he's no longer with Brooke after she rejected his proposal. The group decides to continue on.

In search of a new MC, Mike brings the group to a Savannah strip club owned by Rome, a woman Mike has a history with. Despite proving that his skills haven't deteriorated, he's unsuccessful in getting her to help them. However, she gets Andre, a rapper/singer who works at the club, to drive them to their next stop.

Arriving at a mansion, Tito tells them he knows the girl who lives there and she's expecting them. Walking in, they are greeted by her mother, Nancy, and her friends, all middle-aged women. Nancy's teasing initially makes them feel awkward but as the night goes on, the mood lightens. Mike meets Zoe again, and she tells him about how another photographer, under the guise of needing an assistant, tried to have an extramarital affair with her. Mike urges her to regain her smile at the convention.

After sleeping with Richie, Nancy lets them drive her ex-husband's car to Myrtle Beach. Upon arrival, they are surprised to see Rome. She had a change of heart, agreeing to be their MC. Andre and Malik also came to help. With preparations complete, they head to the convention where they squeeze in a spot thanks to Rome and her history with the organizer of the event, Paris. 

The group's performance is a success. During Mike and Malik's performance, Mike brings Zoe on stage. The film ends in celebration, Tobias returning with the fro-yo van and everyone watching the 4th of July fireworks.

Cast

Channing Tatum as Michael "Magic Mike" Lane
Matt Bomer as Ken
Joe Manganiello as Big Dick Richie
Kevin Nash as Tarzan/Ernest
Adam Rodríguez as Tito
Gabriel Iglesias as Tobias
Andie MacDowell as Nancy Davidson
Amber Heard as Zoe
Jada Pinkett Smith as Rome
Elizabeth Banks as Paris
Donald Glover as Andre
Michael Strahan as Augustus
Brandon Richardson as Scorpio
Stephen "tWitch" Boss as Malik
Jane McNeil as Mae
Rhoda Griffis as Julia
Ann Hamilton as Diane
Mary Kraft as Jessica
Carrie Anne Hunt as Megan Davidson
Vicky Vox as Tori Snatch
Crystal Hunt as Lauren
Deidre Goodwin as Tarzan's Girl
Ric Flair as himself

Production

Development
In a Twitter Q&A in July 2012, Tatum confirmed work on a sequel. The actor responded: "Yes, yes and yes! We're working on the concept now. We want to flip the script and make it bigger." By March 2014, Magic Mike first assistant director Gregory Jacobs had been chosen to direct the sequel, titled Magic Mike XXL and scheduled to begin shooting by the end of 2014. Steven Soderbergh, the original film's director, acted as editor and cinematographer. The film was released on schedule on July 1, 2015.

Casting
On September 17, 2014, it was officially announced by director Jacobs during an interview with Indiewire that Matthew McConaughey would not be returning for the film. Alex Pettyfer and Cody Horn were also confirmed as not returning. On September 18, 2014, Jada Pinkett Smith was in talks to join the cast. On September 22, 2014, Smith was confirmed to play a role originally written for a male actor. On September 29, 2014, as production began in Savannah, Greg Silverman announced the official cast and plot of the film, returning cast includes Tatum, Bomer, Manganiello, Nash, Adam Rodríguez and Gabriel Iglesias, while new cast members include Elizabeth Banks, Donald Glover, Amber Heard, Andie MacDowell, Smith and Michael Strahan. On October 8, 2014, Stephen "tWitch" Boss announced his involvement in the film. Boss said that he was asked by Tatum to join the cast. Actor and former bodybuilder Christian Boeving filmed his scenes for the movie but they were edited out during the post-production process.

Filming
On August 31, 2014, filming took place in Myrtle Beach, South Carolina, including 2nd Avenue Pier, Pier 14, Plyler Park, Myrtle Beach SkyWheel and Myrtle Beach Aviation located in the former Myrtle Beach Air Force Base. On September 29, filming began on location in Savannah, Georgia, where the shoot took place at the Savannah Gentleman's Club, some photos from the set were also shared by actors. On September 30, the shooting took place on Tybee Island. Filming took place October 23–25 in Savannah, GA, where more than 900 women extras were used, 300–900 each day for Convention scenes. Filming officially wrapped on November 5, 2014 with a final sequence filmed on the Myrtle Beach Boardwalk, South Carolina.

Soundtrack
The soundtrack of the film consists of R&B and hip hop songs that the men dance to, including "Pony" by Ginuwine, which was also included in the first film. The album was released on June 30, 2015 in the United States by WaterTower Music. Included in the film and on the album are Matt Bomer's covers of "Untitled (How Does It Feel)" by D'Angelo and "Heaven" by Bryan Adams. As well as acting in the film, Donald Glover also features on the soundtrack where he covers "Marry You" originally by Bruno Mars. The album also contains "I Want It That Way" by the Backstreet Boys (which serves as the music for an impromptu public routine by Manganiello).

Charts

Reception

Box office 
Magic Mike XXL grossed $66 million in North America and $56.5 million in other territories for a worldwide total of $122.5 million, against a budget of $14.8 million.

The film was released alongside Terminator Genisys, and along with holdovers Jurassic World and Inside Out, each was projected to earn $27–30 million over the three-day weekend and $45–55 million during the five-day Independence Day stretch. It made $2.4 million from Tuesday night showings (higher than the $2.1 million earned by its predecessor's preview screenings) and $9.3 million on its opening day (Wednesday) – including Tuesday showings. In its opening weekend, the film grossed $12.8 million ($27.9 million for the five-day total), coming in below expectations and finishing 4th at the box office behind Inside Out ($29.7 million), Jurassic World ($29.2 million) and Terminator Genisys ($27 million).

Critical response
On Rotten Tomatoes the film has a rating of 65% based on 242 reviews, with an average rating of 6/10. The site's critical consensus reads, "Magic Mike XXL has enough narrative thrust and beefy charm to deliver another helping of well-oiled entertainment, even if this sequel isn't quite as pleasurable as its predecessor." On Metacritic the film has a score of 60 out of 100, based on 41 critics, indicating "mixed or average reviews". In CinemaScore polls, cinema audiences gave the film an average grade of "A−" on an A+ to F scale.

Accolades

Sequel

A sequel, Magic Mike's Last Dance, was announced on November 29, 2021. In 2022, it was reported that Steven Soderbergh would return after having directed the first film. Thandiwe Newton was initially cast in an unspecified role but was replaced by Salma Hayek in April 2022. In July 2022, Soderbergh announced that there are developments ongoing for additional installments in the franchise for stories centered around other characters unrelated to Mike Lane. The film was originally produced for streaming release on HBO Max, but in September 2022, it was announced that the film would instead be released theatrically, on February 10, 2023.

References

External links

2010s English-language films
2010s American films
2010s sex comedy films
2010s road comedy-drama films
2010s erotic drama films
2015 films
2015 comedy films
2015 drama films
2015 independent films
American erotic drama films
American sex comedy films
American road comedy-drama films
American comedy-drama films
American dance films
American sequel films
American sexploitation films
American independent films
Comedy-drama films based on actual events
Films directed by Gregory Jacobs
Films produced by Gregory Jacobs
Male erotic dance
Films about striptease
Films set in Florida
Films set in South Carolina
Films shot in Georgia (U.S. state)
Films shot in South Carolina
Warner Bros. films
Dune Entertainment films